FIFA, through several companies, sold the broadcasting rights for the 2019 FIFA Women's World Cup to the following broadcasters.

Television

Participating nations

Non-participating nations

Radio

Participating nations

Non-participating nations

Notes
- EBU has made an agreement for 38 territories. They made the event also available in these territories on their own website eurovisionsports.tv, where you can watch the games live when they are not broadcast or streamed by the local broadcaster and on-demand.

- CTA Coverage is not available in Dominican Republic, Nicaragua, and Panama

References 

2019 FIFA Women's World Cup
FIFA Women's World Cup broadcasting rights